Slaboye zveno (English translation: A weak link) is the Russian version of the game show The Weakest Link. It was first broadcast on September 25, 2001 on Channel One Russia.

Money tree

Interesting facts
In late 2002, the channel's several leading game show hosts swapped places. In the event Mariya Kiselyova hosted the New Year edition of Who Wants to Be a Millionaire?, while Pole Chudes host Leonid Yakubovich hosted The Weakest Link. That episode has set a record. The winner Roman Madyanov has received a prize of ₽402,000 rubles (out of the grand prize of 1 million rubles).

References

Russian game shows
Russian television series based on British television series
2000s Russian television series
2020s Russian television series
2001 Russian television series debuts
Channel One Russia original programming
The Weakest Link